Pedro Salas (7 December 1923 – 15 June 2000) was an Argentine cyclist. He competed in the 4,000 metres team pursuit event at the 1952 Summer Olympics.

References

1923 births
2000 deaths
Argentine male cyclists
Olympic cyclists of Argentina
Cyclists at the 1952 Summer Olympics
Sportspeople from Córdoba, Argentina
Pan American Games medalists in cycling
Pan American Games gold medalists for Argentina
Pan American Games silver medalists for Argentina
Cyclists at the 1951 Pan American Games
Medalists at the 1951 Pan American Games